"Goodnight Sweetheart" is a song co-written by Kim Williams, L. David Lewis and Randy Boudreaux. It was recorded by American country music artist Joe Diffie for his 1992 album Regular Joe. The song was later recorded by American country music artist David Kersh for his album Goodnight Sweetheart. Released as the album's second single in July 1996, it reached number 6 on the Billboard Hot Country Singles & Tracks chart but missed the top 40 on the Canadian RPM Country Tracks chart.

Music video
The music video was directed by Chris Rogers and premiered in mid-1996.

Chart performance
"Goodnight Sweetheart" peaked at number 6 on the country charts in the U.S.

References

1992 songs
1996 singles
Joe Diffie songs
David Kersh songs
Songs written by Randy Boudreaux
Curb Records singles
Songs written by Kim Williams (songwriter)